Canada–South Korea relations are foreign relations between Canada and the Republic of Korea. Canadian soldiers participated in the defense of South Korea during the Korean War.  Full diplomatic relations between Canada and South Korea were established on January 14, 1963. Canada has an embassy in Seoul, and a consulate in Busan. South Korea has an embassy in Ottawa and three Consulates-General, in Montreal, Toronto and Vancouver.  Both nations are full members of APEC, OECD and the G20.

History
Contact between Canada and the Republic of Korea date back to the 19th century when Canadians were some of the first Westerners to arrive on the Korean peninsula, a majority of whom were Christian missionaries, though they branched out into other fields of work. Rev. Canadian James S. Gale (1863-1937) created the Korean-English Dictionary which became the first and most essential tool for the scholarly study of Korea in the West; and did an independent translation of the Bible into the Korean language. Another Canadian, Dr. Oliver R. Avison, was the personal physician to King Kojong (1852-1919) and is considered the founder of modern medical knowledge in Korea. Dr. Frank Schofield, a British-born Canadian from Guelph, Ontario, played an important role in the liberation of Korea from the Japanese occupation. Schofield is the only westerner buried in the patriot section in Korea's National Cemetery. Official contact began in 1947 when Canada participated in the  United Nations Commission overseeing election in Korea, and Canada formally recognized the Republic of Korea in 1949.

When war broke out between North Korea and South Korea in 1950, Canada sent 26,971 military personnel to the Korean peninsula as part of a United Nations force, the third largest contingent behind the United States and the United Kingdom. Additionally, Canadians saw action in both naval and air forces with eight destroyers, 3,621 naval officers and men, twenty-two fighter pilots and several technical officers; whom were attached to the U.S. Fifth Air Force. Canada continued peacekeeping operations in Korea with the introduction of the Armistice Agreement.  Due to the nature of the Korean War as the "Forgotten War", public awareness has been raised with the dedication of a national monument in 1997 - the Wall of Remembrance in Brampton, Ontario.  516 Canadians died in the war and 378 Canadians lie buried in the United Nations Memorial Cemetery in Busan.

In 2018, two Canadian nationals, Michael Kovrig and Michael Spavor, were detained in China after being accused by the Chinese government of espionage and endangering national security. On February 12, 2021, Canada and 57 other nations, including the US, UK, Australia, Germany and Sweden, jointly signed a declaration condemning the use of arbitrarily detaining people for political purposes. In response, China called Canada’s action a “despicable and hypocritical act”. The declaration was supported by 57 countries, though one historically democratic country not on the list of supporters is South Korea, which has been looking to build a stronger relationship with China. On March 22, 2021, Michael Kovrig’s trial began in Beijing behind closed doors.

Trade

In 2014, South Korea was the 7th largest destination for Canadian exports the 3rd largest in Asia. In December 2009, Canadian Prime Minister, Stephen Harper, traveled to Seoul on his Asian Tour.  The two countries talked on opening further trade relations.  Despite suggesting trade advancements in technology and resources, South Korea did not commit to a lifting of the ban on Canadian beef. In October 2011, Canadian Agriculture Minister Gerry Ritz stated that he felt confident that South Korea would reopen the South Korean market to Canadian beef by year's end. The ban has existed since 2003.

Trade relations in the beef market have softened as of early 2012, ending the ban of imported beef.  Canada continues to make significant strides in relations with Korea in many areas, including open free trade agreements.

On March 11, 2014, Prime Minister Stephen Harper and President Park Geun-hye announced that Canada and South Korea had concluded negotiations on the Canada–Korea Free Trade Agreement.

Canadian-South Korean bilateral trade reached (CAD) $10.1 billion in 2012. Canadian export to South Korea were $3.7 billion, while South Korean exports to Canada reached $6.3 billion. Canada's main exports to South Korea were mineral fuels and oils (crude), cereals, wood pulp, mineral ores and meat. South Korea's main exports to Canada were vehicles, electrical equipment, machinery, oils (not crude) and iron/steel.

North Korea 
Canada's interests in North Korea are represented through the Embassy of Canada in South Korea.

Rejection of Marijuana Legalization 
On October 22, 2018, the South Korean government snubbed Canada's legalization of recreational marijuana and warned South Korean citizens in the country that they must comply with South Korean law and will be arrested if they use or are in possession of recreational marijuana in Canada.

Culture 
The South Korean government maintains the Korean Education Centre  in Toronto.

See also

 Canada–Korea Free Trade Agreement
 Canada–North Korea relations
 Foreign relations of Canada
 Foreign relations of South Korea
 Korean Canadian
 Asia–Canada relations

References

External links
  Canadian Ministry of Foreign Affairs and International Trade about relations with South Korea
 Canadian embassy in Seoul
  Korean Ministry of Foreign Affairs and Trade about relations with Canada
  South Korean embassy in Ottawa
  South Korean consulate in Montreal
 South Korean consulate in Toronto
 South Korean consulate in Vancouver
 the Asia Pacific Foundation of Canada

 
South Korea
Bilateral relations of South Korea